Moinabad (also Romanized as Mo‘īnābād) is a village in Bazarjan Rural District, in the Central District of Tafresh County, Markazi Province, Iran. At the 2006 census, its population was 63, consisting of 19 families.

References 

Populated places in Tafresh County